Przelewice  is a village in Pyrzyce County, West Pomeranian Voivodeship, in north-western Poland. It is the seat of the gmina (administrative district) called Gmina Przelewice. The village has a population of 770.

Before World War II the area was part of Germany. For the history of the region, see History of Pomerania.

The Dendrological Garden in Przelewice is located in the village.

References

Przelewice